This is a discography for Charles Aznavour.

In a composer/singer/songwriter career spanning over 70 years, Charles Aznavour recorded more than 1,200 songs interpreted in nine languages.  For himself and others, he has written or co-written more than 1,000 songs. He has sold 180 million records, appeared in more than 80 films and was voted Time magazine's entertainer of the 20th century, edging out Elvis and Bob Dylan.

In this article you will find all the French and international discography of Charles Aznavour, from his first 78 RPM made with Pierre Roche for the Polydor label, to his most recent CDs released on the EMI and Barclay Records labels.

French discography
Source:

Studio albums

EPs

Singles

Compilation albums

English discography

Studio albums 
{| class="wikitable" 
!align="left" valign="top" width="40"|Year
!align="left" valign="top" width="350"|Album
!align="center" valign="top" width="70"|Label
!align="left" valign="top" width="130"|Notes
|-
|align="left" valign="top"|1958
|align="left" valign="top"|Believe in Me !
|align="center" valign="top"|Ducretet-Thomson
|align="center" valign="top"|
|-
|align="left" valign="top"|1962
|align="left" valign="top"|The Time Is Now
|align="center" valign="top"|Mercury
|align="center" valign="top"|Also issued in 1962, Mercury, Stereo; Reissued in 1963, Pour vous mesdames (London Globe Records/DECCA/UK, GLB 1003, Mono), the song "I Know I'm Wrong" replaces "Les comédiens" + new recording of "Sarah"; Reissued for digital download in 2015 "The Time is Now", Stage Door, Mono
|-
|align="left" valign="top"|1965
|align="left" valign="top"|His Love Songs in English
|align="center" valign="top"|Reprise
|align="center" valign="top"|Also issued in 1965, Reprise, Stereo
|-
|align="left" valign="top"|1967
|align="left" valign="top"|His Kind of Love Songs
|align="center" valign="top"|Reprise
|align="center" valign="top"|Also issued in 1967, Reprise, Stereo
|-
|align="left" valign="top"|1969
|align="left" valign="top"|Of Flesh and Soul – Charles Aznavour Sings In English
|align="center" valign="top"|Monument
|align="center" valign="top"|Also issued in 1969, Aznavour sings Aznavour (Barclay/France), the song "Yesterday When I Was Young" replaces "A Blue Like the Blue of Your Eyes".
|-
|align="left" valign="top"|1970
|align="left" valign="top"|A Man's Life: Charles Aznavour
|align="center" valign="top"|Monument
|align="center" valign="top"|Reissued in 1971, Aznavour sings Aznavour Vol. 2 (Barclay/France), the song  "A Blue Like the Blue of Your Eyes" replaces "Yesterday When I Was Young".
|-
|align="left" valign="top"|1972
|align="left" valign="top"|I Have Lived
|align="center" valign="top"|MGM Records
|align="center" valign="top"|Also issued in 1972, Aznavour Sings Aznavour Vol. 3 (Barclay/France & UK), the short version of "The Old Fashioned Ways" replace the long version featured on the American album; Reissued in 1975, The Old Fashioned Way (Barclay/France). 
|-
|align="left" valign="top"|1974
|align="left" valign="top"|A Tapestry of Dreams
|align="center" valign="top"|Barclay
|align="center" valign="top"|
|-
|align="left" valign="top"|1974
|align="left" valign="top"|I Sing For... You
|align="center" valign="top"|Barclay
|align="center" valign="top"|
|-
|align="left" valign="top"|1978
|align="left" valign="top"|We Were Happy Then 
|align="center" valign="top"|MAM Records
|align="center" valign="top"|Also issued in 1978 Esquire (EMI/UK)
|-
|align="left" valign="top"|1978
|align="left" valign="top"|A Private Christmas
|align="center" valign="top"|MAM Records
|align="center" valign="top"|Reissued in 1981 My Christmas Album (UK) (with a new recorded version of "She")
|-
|align="left" valign="top"|1983
|align="left" valign="top"|Aznavour '83
|align="center" valign="top"|Barclay
|align="center" valign="top"|Also issued in 1983, In Times To Be (Barclay/UK); Also issued in 1983, I'll Be There (Barclay/France)
|-
|align="left" valign="top"|1995
|align="left" valign="top"|You and Me|align="center" valign="top"|EMI
|align="center" valign="top"|
|}

 EPs 

 Singles 

 Compilations 

 Spanish discography 

 Studio albums 

 EPs 

 Singles 

 Compilations 

 Italian discography 

 Studio albums 

 EPs 

 Singles 

 Compilations 

 German discography 

 Studio albums 

 EPs 

 Singles 

 Compilations 

 Live albums 

Collaborations and guest appearances

Other album appearances
Various artist compilation albums

 In Canada only 

 In Venezuela only 

Video albums

Video
 1977 Großer Unterhaltungsabend – Charles Aznavour (Essen, Germany 1977). VHS Nikkatsu Video Films Co., Ltd./Japan
 1982 An Evening with Charles Aznavour (Duke of York's Theatre, London 1982). VIP Videocassette Diffusion, VHS SECAM MU 550

Laserdisc
 1982 An Evening with Charles Aznavour (Duke of York's Theatre, London 1982) [content differs from the video version]

DVD/BD
 1999 Aznavour Live - Palais des Congrès 97/98 (EMI)
 2001 Aznavour Live - Olympia 68/72/78/80 (EMI)
 2001 Charles Aznavour au Carnegie Hall (New York, June 1996) (EMI)
 2001 AZNAVOUR – Pour toi Arménie (At Yerevan Opera, September 1996)
 2003 AZNAVOUR LIVE – Palais des Congrès 1994 (EMI)
 2004 Aznavour – Minnelli au Palais des Congrès de Paris (EMI)
 2004 Toronto 1980 (as a Bonus to the Aznavour/Indispensables CD Boxset) (EMI)
 2004 Bon Anniversaire Charles – Palais des congrès 2004 (EMI)
 2004 80 - Bon anniversaire Charles! (TV broadcast concert for Charles Aznavour 80th anniversary, 22 May 2004) (EMI)
 2005 Charles Aznavour 2000 – Concert intégral (EMI)
 2007 Charles Aznavour et ses amis à Erevan (EMI)
 2007 Aznavour - Palais des Congrès de Paris (1987) [not the same concert as the CD version] (EMI)
 2008 Charles Aznavour et ses amis au Palais Garnier (EMI)
 2009 Anthologie 1955–1972 - 3 DVD Box Set (PAL Only? was NTSC in Canada) (INA / EMI)
 2010 Anthologie volume 2 1973–1999 - 3 DVD Box Set (PAL Only? was NTSC in Canada) (INA / EMI)
 2015 Aznavour Live - Palais des Sports 2015 (DVD & BD, Barclay)

Collaborations
 2002 Patrick Bruel – Entre-Deux (C. Aznavour sings Parlez-moi d'amour [with Patrick Bruel])
 2006 The Royal Opera – Die Fledermaus (Covent Garden, London 31 December 1983)  (C. Aznavour sings She)

 Selective discography as an author or composer 
 1961 Dansez chez Daniela [Original Motion Picture Soundtrack from the movie by Max Pecas "De quoi tu t'mêles Daniela"]. Music: Charles Aznavour et Georges Garvarentz (Ricordi, 30 P 018).
 1965 Marco Polo [Original Motion Picture Soundtrack]. Music: Georges Garvarentz; Lyrics of the original version of Somewhere: Charles Aznavour (Reissued in 1998, Tickertape, TT3006).
 1966 Georges Guétary et Jean Richard - Monsieur Carnaval. Music: Charles Aznavour; Lyrics: Jacques Plante (Reissued in 2015, Marianne Mélodie).
 1973 Marcel Merkès & Paulette Merval - Douchka. French opéra comique of Charles Aznavour & Georges Garvarentz (Reissued in 2001, Sony, SMM 501710 2).
 1981 Jean Claudric joue Charles Aznavour (avec l'Orchestre Colonne). (Enregistrement public, 1981; Cybelia, 1998)
 1996 Karen Brunon interprète Aznavour. (Odeon Records, 1996)
 1998 Ils chantent Aznavour. (Éditions Atlas, 1998)
 2003 Raoul Duflot-Verez - 10 Chansons adaptées pour Piano Solo. (Folio Music, 2003)
 2003 Piaf chante Aznavour. (2003, Compilation)
 2004 Maurice Larcange joue Aznavour et Trénet. (Universal France, 2004, 2006, Compilation)
 2005 Emmenez-moi [Original Motion Picture Soundtrack]. (Warner, 2005)
 2005 Aujourd'hui encore... Hommage à Aznavour. (Trilogie/Québec, 2005)
 2006 Jehan chante Bernard Dimey et Charles Aznavour - Le cul de ma soeur.  Music: Charles Aznavour; Lyrics: Bernard Dimey (Mosaic Music, 2006).
 2008 Charles Aznavour et ses premiers interprètes. (Frémeaux, Compilation, 2 CD)
 2008 Vive Aznavour - 70 artistes essentiels chantent ses premiers succès''. (Marianne Melodie, Compilation, 5 CD)

Songs catalogue
 International Catalog of all recordings available

References
 Aznavour, le roi de cœur, Annie et Bernard Réval, préface de Pierre Roche, France-Empire, 2000
 "Je chante" Magazine, Hors série N° 1 - Spécial Charles Aznavour, 2003
 Charles Aznavour ou Le destin apprivoisé, Daniel Pantchenko (avec Marc Robine), Fayard-Chorus, 2006
 Charles Aznavour, passionnément, Caroline Réali, préface de Paul Mauriat. City, 2007

Notes

Pop music discographies